The Stilt is the journal of the Australasian Wader Studies Group (AWSG), a special interest group of the Royal Australasian Ornithologists Union, also known as Birds Australia. It was first issued in 1981. 

The journal contains papers, reports, and articles about waders within the Flyway and is one of the major publications in the world dedicated solely to waders.

See also
List of ornithology journals

References

External links
 

Journals and magazines relating to birding and ornithology
Publications established in 1981